Neil Alan Pearson (9 September 1925 – 27 April 2011) was an Australian rules footballer who played with Hawthorn in the Victorian Football League (VFL).

Family
The son of Leslie John Ramsay Pearson, and May Eleanor Pearson, née Brown, Neil Alan Pearson was born at Ballarat, on 9 September 1925.

His younger brother Ian played at St Kilda and Hawthorn.

Military service
Pearson enlisted three weeks after his eighteenth birthday, serving in Townsville and New Guinea with the Royal Australian Air Force.

Football
Pearson made his debut in the opening round of the 1945 VFL season against Essendon and kicked four goals.

A wingman, he was a solid performer for Hawthorn and brought up his 100th league game in 1952. He represented Victoria at the 1953 Adelaide Carnival, where they went undefeated.

Despite only playing 13 games in the 1953 season, Pearson was Hawthorn's equal leading vote-getter at the Brownlow Medal count that year.

He won a Gardiner Medal in 1954 as playing coach of the reserves but also participated in seven VFL games during the year.

Honours and achievements
Individual
 Gardiner Medal: 1954
 Hawthorn life member

Notes

References
 
 
 A9301, 144845: World War Two Service Record: Leading Aircraftman Neil Alan Pearson  (144845), National Archives of Australia.

External links
 
 
 Neil Pearson at The VFA Project
 Neal Pearson at Boyles Football Photos
 Hawthorn Team Photos at Boyles Football Photos
 Brighton VFA Photos by Other Photographers at Boyles Football Photos

1925 births
Australian rules footballers from Victoria (Australia)
Hawthorn Football Club players
Brighton Football Club players
Brighton Football Club coaches
2011 deaths